Opalimosina mirabilis is a species of lesser dung flies (insects in the family Sphaeroceridae).

References

Sphaeroceridae
Articles created by Qbugbot
Insects described in 1902
Taxa named by James Edward Collin